How Kitchener Was Betrayed is a 1921 British silent war film directed by Percy Nash and starring Fred Paul, Winifred Evans, and Bertram Burleigh. It was a fictional portrayal of the events leading up to the death of Herbert Kitchener on HMS Hampshire during the First World War in which the German secret service received warning of the general's activities through a German agent Elbie Böcker. The film was intended to cash in on the controversy raised by the publication of a biography of Kitchener in 1920 challenging the Admiralty's official conclusion that the ship was sunk by a mine. Only one of its six reels survives.

Controversy
The film's plot raised objections from a number of figures on the grounds of historical inaccuracy and it was refused a licence by the London County Council (LCC) authorities, effectively barring its distribution throughout Britain. Pressure was also successfully exerted on William Hays of the Motion Picture Association of America to ban the film in the United States and the French authorities also refused to screen it. The film's delayed premiere took place at Leicester Square in November 1922, and the LCC immediately took legal action against the cinema owner, who conceded the case. No further attempts were made to release the film. This put in place an effective ban on controversial contemporary history films until the release of Herbert Wilcox's Dawn in 1928.

Cast
 Fred Paul - Field Marshal Kitchener 
 Winifred Evans  -  Elbie Böcker 
 Bertram Burleigh - Lieutenant Mack 
 Peggy Hathaway - Mrs. Mack 
 Ion Swinley - The Spy 
 Wallace Bosco   
 Frank Goldsmith

See also
Fräulein Doktor (1969)

Bibliography
 Robertson, James Crighton. The Hidden Cinema: British Film Censorship in Action, 1913-1975. Routledge, 1993.

References

External links

1921 films
British silent feature films
1921 war films
Films directed by Percy Nash
Films set in the 1910s
Films set in England
Seafaring films
British World War I films
Lost British films
British black-and-white films
Cultural depictions of Herbert Kitchener, 1st Earl Kitchener
British war films
1920s English-language films
1920s British films
Silent adventure films